"King of the Road" is a song written by country singer Roger Miller, who first recorded it in November 1964. 
The lyrics tell of the day-to-day life of a hobo who, despite having little money (a "man of means by no means"), revels in his freedom, describing himself humorously and cynically as the "king of the road". It was Miller's fifth single for Smash Records.

History
The crossover record reached No. 1 on the US Country chart,  No. 4 on the Billboard Hot 100, and No. 1 on the Easy Listening surveys. It was also No. 1 in the UK Singles Chart, and in Norway. Miller recalled that the song was inspired when he was driving and saw a sign on the side of a barn that read, "Trailers for sale or rent". This would become the opening line of the song.

R.E.M.  covered the song in a shambolic, drunken, offhand rendering, guitarist Peter Buck would later comment, "If there was any justice in the world, Roger Miller should be able to sue for what we did to this song."

A comic version by English entertainer Billy Howard, "King of the Cops", was a British chart hit in 1976.

Chart performance

Roger Miller

The Proclaimers

Randy Travis

"Queen of the House"
Country music singer Jody Miller (no relation) answered "King of the Road" with "Queen of the House" (1965).  The song used Roger Miller's music while changing the lyrics to describe the day-to-day life of a stay-at-home mom. The words were written by Mary Taylor.The song was a hit, reaching number 12 on Billboard's Hot 100 and number 5 on the Hot Country Singles chart. It also won a Grammy for Female Country Vocal Performance.

Connie Francis later recorded this song on her 1966 album Live at the Sahara (1966).

The Supremes performed "Queen of the House" in their nightclub act.  It can be heard on their The Supremes at the Copa (1965) album and I Hear a Symphony remastered CD, which includes their September 1966 appearance at the Roostertail in Detroit, on the second disc.

References

External links
Sample from the Roger Miller official site

1964 songs
1965 singles
Roger Miller songs
The Proclaimers songs
Randy Travis songs
Glen Campbell songs
UK Singles Chart number-one singles
Number-one singles in Norway
Songs written by Roger Miller
Grammy Hall of Fame Award recipients
Song recordings produced by Jerry Kennedy
Smash Records singles
Songs about homelessness